"The One That Got Away" is a song by American singer-songwriter Katy Perry for her third studio album, Teenage Dream (2010). The song was produced by Dr. Luke and Max Martin, both of whom also co-wrote the song with Perry. The song is a mid-tempo pop ballad about a lost love. It features a reference to the rock band Radiohead, and compares the strength of the relationship to that of Johnny Cash and June Carter Cash. The song was released on September 30, 2011, by Capitol Records as the album's sixth single.

"The One That Got Away" peaked at number three on the Billboard Hot 100, with Teenage Dream becoming the seventh album in the 53-year history of the Hot 100 to generate at least six top 10s. The single reached the top of the Billboard Hot Dance Club Songs, Adult Top 40, and Mainstream Top 40 charts.

The accompanying music video for the song was directed by Floria Sigismondi and premiered in November 2011, featuring actor Diego Luna. An official remix featuring rapper B.o.B was released to digital retailers on December 20, 2011. An official acoustic rendition was released to digital retailers on January 16, 2012, this version was included in Teenage Dream: The Complete Confection edition. The song has been covered by several artists, including Kelly Clarkson, Olivia Rodrigo and Conan Gray, Richard Marx, Jordan Pruitt, Selena Gomez & the Scene, Tate McRae, and Time Will Tell.

Release and artwork
On September 13, 2011, at the New York City's Irving Plaza, Capitol Records confirmed to Billboard that "The One That Got Away" would be the sixth single from Teenage Dream. Perry said in a statement from the label:

Later that month, Perry wrote the following message on her Twitter account: "The One That Got Away... It's happening!!!", along with a picture of the official single artwork. The artwork shows a pink-haired Perry looking up at the sky while wearing a disc-shaped hat. The photo gives a whimsical nod to the 1970s, with its distinctively retro appearance. On September 30, the song received radio airplay release in France. Soon it was followed by the release of the song to American mainstream and rhythmic contemporary radio stations on October 11. The single was issued to Italian radios through EMI Music Publishing on October 28. On December 2, the remix EP of "The One That Got Away" was released. The remix featuring American rapper B.o.B was issued by Capitol Records to American pop and rhythmic radios on December 15, followed by a digital release of the song five days later. Acoustic rendition of the song was released on January 16, 2012.

Capitol Records said that they are not specifically releasing the song in hopes of it reaching number one and rewriting Hot 100 history (since Perry was the first woman to obtain five number ones on the chart from one album), rather the decision came out of "Perry's fondness for the song, its ear-catching hook and her obvious track record of success at pop radio". EMI Music/Capitol Records EVP/marketing and promotion Greg Thompson told Billboard that, "if it goes to No. 1, that would be great, If not, we still have a Katy song on the radio in fourth quarter", presumably boosting sales for Teenage Dream in the Christmas season.

Composition and writing

Originally titled "In Another Life", the song was produced by Dr. Luke and Max Martin, both of whom co-wrote it with Perry. It is a midtempo pop song positioned on the piece of E major and has a tempo of 134 beats per minute. Joanna Holcombe from Yahoo! Music noted that the song is about first loves. Leah Greenblatt from Entertainment Weekly, said that the song is "a midtempo ode to a summer-after-high-school love with whom she recalls sharing Mustang makeout sessions to Radiohead'". Michael Wood from Spin magazine said that the song is one of the album's quieter cuts and that it recalls "Perry's singer-songwriter days at L.A.'s Hotel Café". The song follows the chord progression of E–G♯m–C♯m–A, and Perry's vocal range spans from B3 to E5. Kitty Empire noticed that Perry's vocal is wistful throughout the song and that the references to June Carter Cash and Johnny Cash were unexpected. Rob Sheffield from Rolling Stone stated that when Perry sings, 'I was June, and you were my Johnny Cash,' "it's understood that she's thinking of the scrubbed-up Hollywood version of June and Johnny, from Walk the Line." After death of actor Johnny Lewis, media outlets speculated that the song was about him. In 2017, the singer revealed that "The One That Got Away" was about Josh Groban.

Critical reception
The song received mostly positive reviews from critics.
Kerri Mason from Billboard described the song as "delectable", noting that it has more texture than anything on Perry's previous album, One of the Boys. Mikael Wood from Spin magazine said that although "Perry delivers the gurl-gone-wild stuff with requisite sass", she actually "sounds more engaged on 'Not Like the Movies,' and 'The One That Got Away'. Similarly, Kitty Empire from The Guardian praised the collaboration, stating that Perry and Luke are at their most appealing in the song. In a similar note, Rob Sheffield from Rolling Stone, stated that Perry is more at home with the mall romance of "The One That Got Away". The same opinion was echoed by Greg Kot from Chicago Tribune who felt that Perry sounds more invested in the more "serious" songs on the album, such as "The One That Got Away". However, he added that it's as if Perry is "determined to balance the summer frothiness with a few shots of 'adult' earnestness". Leah Greenblatt from Entertainment Weekly was not satisfied with the selection of the song as the sixth single, noting that there are better songs on the album that could have been chosen instead. Robert Copsey of the website Digital Spy awarded the song with four out of five stars and said:

Chart performance
On the week ending October 16, 2011, the song debuted at number 94 on the Billboard Hot 100.
In its sixth week it entered the top 10, making Teenage Dream one of only seven albums in Billboards 53-year history to have six singles enter the top 10. On the chart dated December 24, 2011, the single entered the top five, making Teenage Dream the third album to have six or more top-five singles from one album on the chart following Rhythm Nation 1814 by Janet Jackson and Faith by George Michael. On the charts dated January 7, 2012, helped by the release of the remix with B.o.B., the single topped the Hot Dance Club Songs chart, the seventh song on the album to do so, setting a new record in the chart. The same week, the song peaked at number three on the Hot 100, making it Perry's only Teenage Dream single to fail to reach number one. As of January 2015, the song has sold more than 2,750,000 copies in the United States alone.

"The One That Got Away" debuted at number 87 in Australia on the week ending October 10, 2011. before peaking at number 27. In New Zealand, the song debuted at number 40 and later peaked at number 12. It was certified gold by the Recording Industry Association of New Zealand (RIANZ) after selling 7,500 copies there.

Music video

Background

Perry started filming for the video on September 30, 2011. Filming ended on October 2, 2011. The video was shot at the Lima Residence, a contemporary home located in Calabasas, an affluent city in Los Angeles County, California. Mexican actor Diego Luna plays Perry's boyfriend in the video. Photos from the set surfaced online, showing Perry wearing a conservative long-sleeved dress as well as sporting gray hair and prosthetic face wrinkles. The video was directed by Floria Sigismondi, who previously directed the video for "E.T." The music video premiered on November 11, 2011.

On November 4, 2011, a teaser for the video was released, narrated by Stevie Nicks. Nicks provides the elderly woman's voice, speaking about the past and her desire to go back for one day. The video contains scenes of Katy Perry and her past boyfriend (Luna) fighting, intertwined with scenes of them in love. She is later shown as a nostalgic, elderly woman dressed conservatively and standing by a fence looking into the distance. A seven-minute extended version of the video was shown on November 11, 2011, exclusively at select advance screenings of the motion picture My Week with Marilyn. As of March 2021, the video has more than 900 million views on YouTube.

Synopsis
Released on November 11, 2011, the video begins with an elderly woman (Perry) in a white long-sleeved dress entering her modernistic home, returning from a meeting. After she walks past her husband (played by Herman Sinitzyn), he asks her “How was it?”, and she responds by simply saying “It was fine.”, hinting that the two are in a loveless marriage. While making herself a cup of coffee, the elderly woman, unhappy with her present situation, begins to think about her colorful past when the song begins: her younger self with her artist boyfriend (Luna). As the song plays, the happy girl and the boyfriend paint portraits of each other, dress up wildly, dance at a stranger's wedding, and give each other a makeshift tattoo.

As the elderly woman sadly reminisces while sitting on her (and the husband's) fancy bedroom alone in a silk nightgown, her younger self and the boyfriend get into an argument which culminates in her splashing red paint on one of his elaborate paintings after he did the same to one of hers and he leaves angrily then drives away. The woman's younger self appears to her older self's bedroom with each on the bed as they both sing. The younger version is also shown in her older self's closet, crying and singing while the boyfriend is seen driving in a Ford Mustang to blow off steam from the fight. At the same time in the present, the older woman is shown driving out of her garage in a similar type of car as the boyfriend is driving in the flashback.

The boyfriend opens the sun visor above him while driving and finds the veil of the dress the younger version of Perry had worn at the wedding. He stares at the veil, hinting that he decides to make up with her. But he is too distracted by the veil and does not notice the large boulders on the road from a small rock slide. He swerves to avoid the rocks and accidentally drives off a cliff, dying in the subsequent crash without getting a chance to make up, while the woman's younger self collapses at the same time (possibly representing the death of her colorful personality). The song ends abruptly as the sounds of the car violently rolling down the cliff are heard.

While Johnny Cash's cover of "You Are My Sunshine" plays quietly in the background, the woman's older self now sports a dark conservative long-sleeved dress and is revealed to have driven to that same spot where the boyfriend had died. She walks up to the edge of the cliff and leans against a fence when the boyfriend (either a ghost or a hallucination) appears before her on the other side of the fence. The two hold hands, revealing matching tattoos on their hands. When the older woman snaps back to reality, the Johnny Cash music stops suddenly and the boyfriend vanishes. Saddened, the elderly woman turns back and silently walks away from the cliff to return home as the screen fades to black.

Reception
Jillian Mapes of Billboard commented that the video was "beautifully-shot" and praised the interesting plot. A writer of Rolling Stone wrote: "It's a cute clip for a sweet song, but the heavy-handed aging makeup is hard to get over." Erin Strecker from Entertainment Weekly compared the video with Titanic (1997) and Rihanna's video for "We Found Love". Strecker also noted that the video was more "tragic" than he was expecting from Perry. Jocelyn Vena of MTV News said: "Katy Perry's moody, contemplative clip for 'The One That Got Away' perfectly encapsulates both the joy of falling in love and the heartbreak of letting go. It travels through time and space and recalls the story of Perry's one that got away." Consequence of Sounds Chris Coplan called the video a "little more somber" than the videos Perry made for "E.T." and "Last Friday Night (T.G.I.F.)".

Other versions
A seven-minute director's cut version was shown exclusively at select advance screenings of the motion picture My Week with Marilyn on November 11, 2011. The extended version shows a more cinematic side to the plot of the original music video and includes never-before-seen footage, as well as extended dialogue between the characters.

On January 17, 2012, Electronic Arts announced that they would be teaming up with Perry to help promote their new expansion pack for The Sims game franchise called The Sims 3: Showtime, which sees the release of a limited collector's edition that contains in-game content based on herself. An official music video for "The One That Got Away" featuring Perry as a Sim was uploaded on EA's YouTube channel. The storyline shows a female Sim and a male Sim falling in love and getting married. One day, the male Sim collapses in the bathroom floor, he is taken to the hospital and then dies. His wife is then seen mourning at his funeral. Suddenly, she is transported "to another life", Katy Perry's Candyfornia featured in her "California Gurls" music video, where her love interest is still alive and well; they eventually reunite and kiss. It also features most of the in-game content that will be included for the collector's edition of The Sims 3: Showtime and in the stuff pack The Sims 3: Katy Perry's Sweet Treats. As of 2022, the video is reach 1 million views.

Live performances and other versions

"The One That Got Away" was part of the setlist of Perry's worldwide 2011 concert tour, California Dreams Tour. On October 16, 2011, Perry performed the song on the UK version of The X Factor. Perry performed the song at the American Music Awards on November 20, 2011. Her AMA 2011 performance was followed by a lengthy standing ovation, and presentation of a special award acknowledging Perry as the only female to have five number-one singles from the same album in the United States. Perry performed the song as part of a Live Lounge special for BBC Radio 1's Fearne Cotton on March 19, 2012, along with "Part of Me", "Firework", "Thinking of You" and a censored version of "Niggas in Paris".

A remix featuring American rapper B.o.B was released in December 2011. B.o.B added two new verses, one at the beginning and another replacing the bridge of the album version of the song. The decision for Capitol Records to release a remix and reduce the price of the song to give Perry a sixth number-one song has been criticized by some, noting that this is not Perry's first time adding a featured guest to her single releases. The hit single "E.T.", was modified with verses from Kanye West, while "Last Friday Night (T.G.I.F.)" was given a remix featuring Missy Elliott. However, Billboard, which compiles the charts, have issued multiple columns defending Perry and Capitol, underlining that they are operating under chart rules and that numerous other acts, such as Rihanna and Britney Spears, used the same tactics for charting purposes over the years. An acoustic version of the song, produced by Jon Brion, was released to the iTunes Store on January 16, 2012, garnering more favorable reviews, with critics noting that "The One That Got Away" sounds very naturally as a ballad. Perry's label, Capitol Records, sponsored a contest in January 2012 encouraging fans to record their own acoustic version of the song for a chance to have it featured on Perry's Facebook wall. The song was also included in the setlist of The Prismatic World Tour, in which it is interpolated with Perry's 2009 song "Thinking of You".

A violin cover of the song by music student Grace Youn, which Youn had uploaded to YouTube in 2011, was used in the opening scene of Perry's 2012 documentary, Katy Perry: Part of Me. American Idol contestant Alyssa Raghu sang the song in front of Katy Perry on the Top 10 Reveal episode of Season 17.

Formats and track listings

 Digital download
 "The One That Got Away" – 3:47

 Digital download – featuring B.o.B
 "The One That Got Away" (featuring B.o.B) – 4:22

 Digital download – Acoustic version
 "The One That Got Away" (Acoustic version) – 4:18

 Digital download – The Remixes EP
 "The One That Got Away" (7th Heaven Club Mix) – 8:03
 "The One That Got Away" (Mixin Marc & Tony Svejda Peak Hour Club Mix) – 5:44
 "The One That Got Away" (R3hab Club Mix) – 5:49
 "The One That Got Away" (Plastic Plates Club Mix) – 6:05
 "The One That Got Away" (Tommie Sunshine & Disco Fries Club Mix) – 6:22

Credits and personnel
Credits adapted from Teenage Dream album liner notes.

 Katy Perry – songwriting, lead vocals, guitar (acoustic version)
 Dr. Luke – songwriting, producer, drums, keyboards, programming
 Max Martin – songwriting, producer, drums, keyboards, programming
 Emily Wright – engineer
 Sam Holland – engineer
 Tatiana Gottwald – assistant engineer
 Serban Ghenea – mixing
 Jon Hanes – mix engineer
 Tim Roberts – assistant mix engineer
 Leon Pendarvis – arrangement, conductor

Charts

Weekly charts

Year-end charts

Certifications

Release history

See also
 List of Billboard Dance Club Songs number ones of 2012
 List of Billboard Hot 100 top-ten singles in 2012

References

2011 singles
Katy Perry songs
Pop ballads
2010s ballads
Song recordings produced by Dr. Luke
Song recordings produced by Max Martin
Songs written by Dr. Luke
Songs written by Max Martin
Songs written by Katy Perry
Music videos directed by Floria Sigismondi
2010 songs
Capitol Records singles
Torch songs
Josh Groban